Sean Waddilove (born 19 June 1997) is an Irish sailor. He competed in the 49er event at the 2020 Summer Olympics.

References

External links
 

1997 births
Living people
Irish male sailors (sport)
Olympic sailors of Ireland
Sailors at the 2020 Summer Olympics – 49er
Place of birth missing (living people)